Vladyslav Yevheniyovych Yemets (born 9 September 1997) is a Ukrainian professional footballer who plays as a defender for Kolos Kovalivka.

Career
Yemets is a product of the Kharkiv State College of Physical Culture 1 sportive school. He began his career in the amateur level, but in a short time was signed by the Ukrainian Premier League side FC Zorya Luhansk. However he only participated in the games for under 21 team and played on loan in the Ukrainian First League. In January 2020 he signed his next on loan contract with FC Kolos Kovalivka.

References

External links
 
 
 

1997 births
Living people
Ukrainian footballers
Footballers from Kharkiv
Association football midfielders
FC Zorya Luhansk players
FC Kramatorsk players
FC Kolos Kovalivka players
Ukrainian Premier League players
Ukrainian First League players
Kharkiv State College of Physical Culture 1 alumni